Anaeroglobus is a Gram-negative, cocci, non-spore-forming, anaerobic and non-motile genus of bacteria from the family of Veillonellaceae with one known species (Anaeroglobus geminatus).

References

Further reading 
 

 

Monotypic bacteria genera
Bacteria genera